Dumbrava is a commune in Timiș County, Romania. It is composed of three villages: Bucovăț, Dumbrava (commune seat) and Răchita. It is located in the east of Timiș County and borders Făget to the northeast, Fârdea to the southeast, Traian Vuia to the southwest and Mănăștiur to the northwest.

History 
Dumbrava was established in 1893 by colonizing with Reformed Hungarians from Vésztő, Makó, Köröstarcsa and Gyoma. However, its name is older and comes from a former settlement, on the hearth of which the present-day locality was built. It was called Igazfalva by Hungarians since the Middle Ages. By 1453 there were two small settlements: Alsóigazfalva ("Lower Igazfalva") and Felsőigazfalva ("Upper Igazfalva"); the names seem to have been imposed by the Hungarian nobles, for there were no Hungarians living in the two villages. The two merged by 1464. The Hungarian colony was designed on the forests belonging to the state treasury. The perpendicular streets and houses made of raft typical of the Pannonian Steppe are still preserved today.

The first recorded mention of Bucovăț dates from 1440, when it belonged to the Șoimoș Fortress. By 1514 there were two settlements: Bucovățul de Jos ("Lower Bucovăț") and Bucovățul de Sus ("Upper Bucovăț"), but in 1596 there was only one name for both. It belonged to Krassó-Szörény County, having always been inhabited by Romanians. They built their Orthodox church in 1780.

Răchita was first mentioned in 1393. The village is also mentioned in Marsigli's notes from 1690–1700. At the 1717 census it had 30 houses. In the interwar period it belonged to Plasa Făget, Severin County.

Demographics 

Dumbrava had a population of 2,659 inhabitants at the 2011 census, down 5% from the 2002 census. Most inhabitants are Romanians (78.53%), with a minority of Hungarians (17.71%). For 3.01% of the population, ethnicity is unknown. By religion, most inhabitants are Orthodox (64.54%), but there are also minorities of Reformed (14.22%), Pentecostals (8.24%), Baptists (3.42%), Roman Catholics (2.29%) and Jehovah's Witnesses (1.84%). For 3.05% of the population, religious affiliation is unknown.

References 

Communes in Timiș County
Localities in Romanian Banat